Vugar Hamidullovych Rahimov (also Vyugar Ragymov, ; born February 5, 1986, in Baku, Azerbaijan SSR) is a Ukrainian Greco-Roman wrestler of Azerbaijani descent, who played for the men's featherweight category. He captured a silver medal for his division at the 2011 European Wrestling Championships in Dortmund, Germany, losing out to Armenia's Roman Amoyan. Ragymov is currently a member of the wrestling team for Metallurg Zaporzhye in his current residence Zaporizhia, and is coached and trained by Evgeny Chertkov.

Rakhimov represented Ukraine at the 2012 Summer Olympics in London, where he competed for the men's 55 kg class. He lost the qualifying round match to China's Li Shujin, with a three-set technical score (0–4, 2–0, 0–2), and a classification point score of 1–3.

References

External links
NBC Olympics Profile
 

1986 births
Living people
Olympic wrestlers of Ukraine
Wrestlers at the 2012 Summer Olympics
Sportspeople from Baku
Sportspeople from Zaporizhzhia
Ukrainian male sport wrestlers
Azerbaijani emigrants to Ukraine
Ukrainian people of Azerbaijani descent